= Krupnykh =

Krupnykh (Russian: Крупных, from крупный meaning large) is a gender-neutral Russian surname.
